Sir William Scovell Savory, 1st Baronet,  (30 November 18264 March 1895) was a British surgeon.

Biography
He was born in London, the son of William Henry Savory, and his second wife, Mary Webb. He entered St Bartholomew's Hospital as a student in 1844, becoming M.R.C.S. in 1847, and F.R.C.S. in 1852. From 1849 to 1859 he was demonstrator of anatomy and operative surgery at St Bartholomew's, and for many years curator of the museum, where he devoted himself to pathological and physiological work. In June  1858 he was elected a Fellow of the Royal Society for his papers on "the structure and connections of the valves of the human heart – On the development of striated muscular fibre in Mammalia – Phil Trans 1855 [and] on the relative temperature of arterial and venous Blood".

In 1859 he succeeded Sir James Paget as lecturer on general anatomy and physiology. In 1861 he became assistant surgeon, and in 1867 surgeon, holding the latter post till 1891; and from 1869 to 1889 he was lecturer on surgery. In the College of Surgeons he was a man of the greatest influence, and was president for four successive years, 1885–1888. As Hunterian professor of comparative anatomy and physiology (1859–1861), he lectured on General Physiology and the Physiology of Food. In 1884 he delivered the Bradshaw Lecture (on the Pathology of Cancer) and in 1887 the Hunterian oration to the Royal College of Physicians.

In 1879, at Cork, he had declared against Listerism at the meeting of the British Medical Association, the last public expression, it has been said, by a prominent surgeon against the now accepted method of modern surgery. In 1887 he became surgeon-extraordinary to Queen Victoria, and, in 1890 he was made a baronet. Savory, who was an able operator, but averse from exhibitions of brilliancy, was a powerful and authoritative man in his profession, his lucidity of expression being almost as valuable as his great knowledge of physiology and anatomy.

Personal life

He married, on 30 Nov 1854, Louisa Frances Borradaile (1821–1867). They had an only son, Sir Borradaile Savory, rector of St Bartholomew-the-Great, who succeeded him as second baronet. In 1884 he bought a country property called The Woodlands, Hollybush Hill, Stoke Poges, Buckinghamshire. 

He died on the 4th March 1895 in London and was buried on the western side of Highgate Cemetery.

References

1826 births
1895 deaths
Savory, William Scovell, 1st Baronet
British surgeons
Fellows of the Royal College of Physicians
Fellows of the Royal Society
Alumni of the Medical College of St Bartholomew's Hospital
Burials at Highgate Cemetery